Bentinck Kyun (Bentinck Island)  is an island in the Mergui Archipelago, Burma (Myanmar). It lies 14 km west of Letsok-aw Kyun in the Andaman Sea. Bentinck has a very irregular indented shape. The island is thickly wooded and its area is 78 km2.

References

External links
Myanmar Ecotourism - Ministry of Hotels and Tourism
Mergui Archipelago Photos

Mergui Archipelago